Danapal Venugopal (born 5 November 1936) is a member of the 15th Lok Sabha of India from Tiruvannamalai Constituency. Previously, he represented the Tiruppattur constituency of Tamil Nadu and is a member of the Dravida Munnetra Kazhagam (DMK) political party.

Political career
He got elected to Lok sabha for 5 times and 2 times to Tamil Nadu state assembly.

References

External links
 Members of Fourteenth Lok Sabha - Parliament of India website

Living people
Indian Tamil people
1936 births
India MPs 2004–2009
Dravida Munnetra Kazhagam politicians
India MPs 1996–1997
India MPs 1998–1999
India MPs 1999–2004
Lok Sabha members from Tamil Nadu
India MPs 2009–2014
People from Vellore district
People from Tiruvannamalai district
Tamil Nadu politicians